Megan Leigh Montefusco (born September 3, 1992) is an American professional soccer player who plays for Orlando Pride in the National Women's Soccer League. She has been capped internationally at senior level by the United States.

Montefusco has previously played for the Chicago Red Stars in the Women's Premier Soccer League, for NWSL teams Washington Spirit, Boston Breakers, Reign FC and Houston Dash, as well as the Newcastle Jets in the Australian W-League.

Early life
Raised in Naperville, Illinois, Montefusco attended Neuqua Valley High School where she led the soccer to team to a 24–0 record and first place national ranking. A four-time all-state selection and three-time NSCAA Youth All-American, she was named All-American by both ESPN RISE and Parade magazines in 2010, and won Gatorade State Player of the Year for Illinois the following year.

Montefusco played club soccer for Windy City Pride from 1998 to 2011 and was a member of the regional Olympic Development Program (ODP) for five years. Prior to leaving for college, Montefusco played briefly for the Chicago Red Stars in the Women's Premier Soccer League in 2011. Chicago topped the Midwest Conference North Division and reached the Championship final, eventually losing to Orange County Waves in extra-time 2–1.

Collegiate career
Montefusco attended the University of California, Los Angeles where she played four seasons of college soccer for the Bruins from 2011 to 2014 while majoring in sociology. She joined as the number 21 ranked recruit in the country and first in Illinois by Top Drawer Soccer. Montefusco played in 18 of 21 matches as a freshman under B. J. Snow, making seven starts. She scored her first Bruins goal and only goal of the 2011 season in a 1–0 win over Rutgers on September 4. In 2012, she made 22 appearances as a sophomore but none as a starter. In 2013 under new head coach Amanda Cromwell, Montefusco ranked fourth on the team in minutes played as the Bruins claimed the Pac-12 Conference title before also winning the first NCAA National Championship title in program history. She received All-Tournament honors and served the assist to the game-winning goal during the final, a 1–0 win in extra-time over Florida State Seminoles. As a senior in 2014, Montefusco started in all 24 of the Bruins' games and helped lead a defensive line that recorded a school record 19 shut-outs, allowing six goals on the year. UCLA retained the Pac-12 conference title and reached the 2014 NCAA College Cup quarterfinals before losing 2–1 to Virginia Cavaliers, the only game the Bruins gave up more than one goal in 2014.

Club career

Washington Spirit, 2015–16
Montefusco was selected in the second round (13th overall) of the 2015 NWSL College Draft by the Washington Spirit, one of an NWSL record six strong draft class out of UCLA in 2015. During the 2015 season, she started in all 20 matches for the team and became the first player in team history to play every minute of a single season. She scored one goal, the opener in a 2–1 victory away to the Chicago Red Stars on August 16. The Spirit finished fourth during the regular season with a  record to advance to the playoffs before losing 3–0 in the semifinals to Reign FC. Montefusco was named the 2015 Washington Spirit Defender of the Year and Newcomer of the Year. In 2016, she made 17 appearances for the Spirit as the team finished second in the regular season, two points off Portland Thorns FC for the NWSL Shield, and reached the NWSL Championship for the first time in club history before losing the final on penalties after a 2–2 tie with Western New York Flash.

Newcastle Jets (loans), 2015–17
On October 8, 2015, Montefusco joined Australian W-League club Newcastle Jets on loan for the 2015–16 season during the NWSL offseason and rejoined Newcastle for the 2016–17 season. The team finished 6th and 5th, missing the playoffs both seasons. At the end of the 2016–17 season, Montefusco was named to the PFA W-League Team of the Season.

Boston Breakers, 2017
On November 17, 2016, it was announced that Montefusco had been acquired by the Boston Breakers via trade along with the No. 3 and No. 9 overall picks in the 2017 NWSL College Draft and the No. 2 spot in the Distribution Ranking Order in exchange for Kristie Mewis, Kassey Kallman and the No. 1 spot in the Distribution Ranking Order. She appeared in 23 of 24 matches during the 2017 season, playing the full 90 minutes in each as Boston finished second bottom ahead of Washington on goal difference.

Reign FC, 2018–19 
After Boston Breakers folded in January 2018, Montefusco was selected by Reign FC as the third pick in the 2018 NWSL Dispersal Draft. In her first season with Reign, Montefusco started 21 games and scored once as the team finished third, dropping from second with a final day defeat to Portland Thorns FC before losing in the playoff semifinals to the same opponent a week later. She was a starter in all 20 of her appearances in 2019 before missing the last month of the season with a knee injury.

Houston Dash, 2020–21 
On February 3, 2020, Houston Dash acquired Montefusco in a trade with Reign FC along with Shea Groom and a second-round pick in the 2022 NWSL Draft in exchange for Sofia Huerta and Amber Brooks. With the 2020 NWSL season canceled due to the COVID-19 pandemic, Montefusco eventually made her debut in the return to play replacement 2020 NWSL Challenge Cup tournament. She played in five games including the final as Houston beat the Chicago Red Stars 2–0 to claim the club's first trophy. Montefusco had missed the semifinal with fractured ribs but despite this, returned to the lineup and played the full 90 minutes in the final. She played every minute of the 2021 NWSL Challenge Cup and made a further 21 appearances during the regular season as Houston finished in seventh-place, missing the playoffs by one point.

Orlando Pride, 2022–present 
On January 28, 2022, Orlando Pride acquired Montefusco in a trade with Houston along with $30,000 in allocation money and a third-round pick in the 2023 NWSL Draft in exchange for Marisa Viggiano.

International career
Montefusco represented the United States at the under-16, under-18 and under-20 national team levels. She received her first call-up to the United States senior team in March 2017 for a pair of friendlies against Russia. She debuted on April 6 as a 68th minute substitute for Kelley O'Hara in a 4–0 win before appearing again as a substitute in the next game. In total, Montefusco played 58 minutes for the USWNT.

Personal life 
Montefusco's mother, Cindy, played softball and volleyball at Northern Illinois University. Her cousin, Brittany Bock, also played soccer professionally, overlapping NWSL careers in 2015 although the two never appeared in the same game.

On December 4, 2021, she married former professional Atlantic League and Frontier League baseball player Anthony Montefusco in a ceremony at Old Chicago Main Post Office. He had proposed during a hot air balloon flight in Colorado in August 2020.

Career statistics

Club 
.

International

Honors 
UCLA Bruins
Pac-12 Conference regular season: 2013, 2014
NCAA Women's College Cup: 2013

Houston Dash
NWSL Challenge Cup: 2020

Individual
Gatorade State Player of the Year (Illinois): 2011
PFA W-League Team of the Season: 2016–17

See also

 List of people from Naperville, Illinois
 List of foreign W-League (Australia) players
 List of University of California, Los Angeles people

References

External links

 U.S. Soccer player profile
 
 Washington Spirit player profile 
 Boston Breakers player profile 
 UCLA Bruins player profile

1992 births
Living people
Sportspeople from Naperville, Illinois
Soccer players from Illinois
Women's association football defenders
American women's soccer players
United States women's international soccer players
Parade High School All-Americans (girls' soccer)
Women's Premier Soccer League players
National Women's Soccer League players
A-League Women players
UCLA Bruins women's soccer players
Chicago Red Stars players
Washington Spirit players
Newcastle Jets FC (A-League Women) players
Boston Breakers players
OL Reign players
Houston Dash players
Orlando Pride players
Washington Spirit draft picks
OL Reign draft picks
American expatriate women's soccer players
American expatriate sportspeople in Australia
Expatriate women's soccer players in Australia